Howard Creek is a stream in the U.S. state of Colorado.

Howard Creek has the name of John Howard, a local pioneer.

References

Rivers of Fremont County, Colorado
Rivers of Colorado